Raja Gopal Singh was a former Speaker of Rajasthan Legislative Assembly. He served as speaker in Janata Party rule from 25 September 1979 to 7 July 1980. Gopal Singh belongs to Rajput erstwhile Raja family of Bhadrajun thikana. He used to look after affairs of family heritage hotel (a fort converted hotel).

He was MLA from Ahore in the Jalore district twice in 1977 and 1990.

Mr. Singh, who had been a Raja under the former Jodhpur State, represented Ahore Assembly constituency in Jalore district of the State twice.

Known as a gentleman politician, he was a much respected figure in western Rajasthan.

Not a person who hankered after power and position, he devoted more time in the past decade to conservation of water bodies and building of check dams in Jodhpur, Jalore and Pali districts than in politics.

He was one of the founder members of the water conservation NGO, Jal Bhagirathi Foundation.

References

 Rajasthan Assembly

Rajasthani politicians
Speakers of the Rajasthan Legislative Assembly
People from Jalore district
Governors of Arunachal Pradesh
Janata Party politicians
Year of birth missing
2010 deaths